Villanova Biellese is a comune (municipality) in the Province of Biella in the Italian region Piedmont, located about  northeast of Turin and about  southeast of Biella.

Villanova Biellese borders the following municipalities: Buronzo, Carisio, Massazza, Mottalciata, Salussola.

References

Cities and towns in Piedmont